The 1968 Toronto Argonauts finished in second place in the Eastern Conference with a 9–5 record. They appeared in the Eastern Finals.

Regular season

Standings

Schedule

Postseason

Awards and honours
Bill Symons – CFL Most Outstanding Player, 1107 yds rushing  (This was the first time a Toronto Argonaut had been so honored.)

References

Toronto Argonauts seasons
1968 Canadian Football League season by team